Palitai (or Palite, Parittei, Pattei) is the traditional knife of the Mentawai people, originating from the Mentawai Islands off West Sumatra, Indonesia.

Description 

The Palitai has a straight and double edged blade. The handle is uniquely long, slim and curiously curved in shape. It is a knife with a smooth blade on both edges of which are sharpened and run parallel. The edges come together at the tip to the end in a sharp point. The blade has in the middle along the entire length an elevated rib. The steel used to produce blades was imported from Sumatra, as forging was unknown on Mentawai islands. The blades were finished in the desired form on the spot. The total length may vary from 30 cm to 1 m. The hilt of the Palitai is thin and long, at the blade still rather broad but becoming thinner to run long and elegantly into an almost sharp tip or decorated end. The hilt has a round thicker part just past half way. The Palitai is carried on the right, in the loin-cloth and may be part of the dowry.

See also

Kujang
Keris

References

Further reading 
 
 

Blade weapons
Weapons of Indonesia